The Seven Troughs Range is a mountain range in western Pershing County, Nevada.

The name is derived from a series of seven stock watering troughs placed below a set springs.

Neighboring features include:
the Kama and Antelope ranges to the north, 
the Majuba Mountains to the northeast, 
Sage Valley and Trinity Range to the southeast with Lovelock beyond;
Granite Springs Valley to the south, 
the Sahwave Mountains and small Blue Wing Mountains to the southwest; 
Kumiva Valley and the Selenite Range to the west and 
Black Rock Desert to the northwest.

Mining camps
Along the southeast margin of the range above Sage Valley are several ghost towns dating from the early 1900s, which served the gold mining activity in the canyons.  Below Seven Troughs Canyon was Seven Troughs.  Running from northeast to southwest are the sites of Farrell, Mazuma, and Vernon.

References 

Mountain ranges of Pershing County, Nevada
Mountain ranges of Nevada